The 1966 Coppa Italia Final was the final of the 1965–66 Coppa Italia. The match was played on 14 June 1967 between Fiorentina and Catanzaro. Fiorentina won 2–1 after extra time.

Match

References 
Coppa Italia 1965/66 statistics at rsssf.com
 https://www.calcio.com/calendario/ita-coppa-italia-1965-1966-finale/2/
 https://www.worldfootball.net/schedule/ita-coppa-italia-1965-1966-finale/2/

Coppa Italia Finals
Coppa Italia Final 1966
Coppa Italia Final 1966